The Fugitive Economic Offenders Act, 2018 empowers any special court (set up under the Prevention of Money Laundering Act, 2002) to confiscate all properties and assets of economic offenders who are charged in offences measuring over INR 100 crores and are evading prosecution by remaining outside the jurisdiction of Indian courts. The bill for the act was introduced in the Lok Sabha on 12 March 2018 and passed on 25 July 2018. The Act also provides for provisional attachment of all properties of the offender and confiscation of the same on declaration as fugitive economic offender by the Special Court.

The bill has been subject to mixed reception among legal commentators.

See also
 List of Acts of the Parliament of India
 The Fugitive Economic Offenders Bill, 2018
 As Introduce
 As Passed by Loksabha
 As Passed by both Houses
 पुर: स्थापित रूप में
 लोक सभा द्वारा पारित
 Fugitive Economic Offender

References

2018 in Indian economy
Finance fraud
Fraud in India
Asset forfeiture
Modi administration
Fugitives
Acts of the Parliament of India 2018